James Mathew is an Indian politician from Kannur district, Kerala state, and was a member of the Legislative Assembly of Kerala in 13th and 14th Kerala Legislative Assembly. He represents the Taliparamba constituency of Kerala and is a  Kerala state committee member of the Communist Party of India (Marxist) (CPI(M)) political party.

Personal life 
Son of Shri N. J. Mathew and Smt. Chinnamma Mathew; born at Kannur on 20 March 1961. He holds a degree in B. A. in Political Science. He was married to  Smt. N. Sukanya. The couple have one daughter and one son.

Political career 
He started political life as an S.F.I. activist during Emergency period and served as Kannur District President, Secretary, State President, State Secretary, and All India Joint Secretary of S.F.I.; assaulted by police while participating in students agitations led by S.F.I.; was Area Secretary, C.P.I.(M), Sreekandapuram: Member, C.P.I.(M) District Secretariat and District Committee, Kannur; Member: Calicut University Senate, Kannur University Syndicate and Kannur District Panchayat; Standing Committee Chairman, District Panchayat, Kannur.

References

External links
James Mathew MLA 

1961 births
Living people
Kerala MLAs 2016–2021
Kerala MLAs 2011–2016
Communist Party of India (Marxist) politicians from Kerala
People from Kannur district